The , also known as the  is a ski jumping venue located in the Miyanomori area in Chūō-ku, Sapporo, Hokkaidō, Japan. Owned mostly by Sapporo City, the ski jump is on the eastern slope of the Mt. Okura. The stadium has hosted a number of winter sports events including 1972 Winter Olympics and FIS Nordic World Ski Championships 2007. The area of stadium consists of the Winter Sports Museum, the Ōkurayama Crystal House, and the Mt. Okura Observation Platform, as well as the ski jump.

The stadium has area of 8.2 ha which houses 50,000 people at a maximum during a competition, and the ski jump is categorized as the large hill jump. The total height of the jump hill from the top starting point to the bottom of the slope is 133 metres, also the distance to the K-spot (critical point) is 120 metres.

History 
In 1931, the Okurayama Ski Jump Stadium was constructed by Kishichiro Okura with an advice and financial aid of Prince Chichibu, a brother of Hirohito, and was donated to Sapporo after the completion. Another name "Ōkurayama-Schanze" originated with the inauguration ceremony in 1931, when the mayor of Sapporo at that time, Masaharu Hashimoto, named the ski jump as "Ōkura Schanze" after its founder. The term schanze means ski jump in German. The jump and stadium ware designed by Olaf Helset, the president of the Norwegian ski federation.

The stadium was renovated with the national expenditure in 1970, which was to suit in coming 1972 Winter Olympics. After the renovation, the stadium had the K-spot at the point of 110 metres, and was capable of housing 50,000 people. At the same time, the word "yama" ("the mountain" in Japanese) was added to its name, thus the stadium was called the "Ōkurayama Jampu Kyōgijō" (Mt. Okura Ski Jump Stadium) . For the 1972 Winter Olympics, the ski jump was the venue of 90 metres class ski jumping competition.

The ski jump was remodeled many times under advice from the International Ski Federation, and the ski lift toward top of the mountain in 1982, and the distance of the K-spot was extended to 115 metres in 1986, and 120 metres in 1996.

The stadium has been under the jurisdiction of the government of Japan until 1995, when it was switched as a facility under the control of Sapporo. In 1998, the ski jump in the stadium was remodeled to include the Summer Hill, a ski jump which enables skiers to jump even in the summer. Also the ski lift was extended, and lighting was installed for night competitions. In 2005, the monument of the Ballad of the Rainbow and Snow, the theme song of 1972 Winter Olympics, was erected.

Overview 

The Mt. Okura Ski Jump Stadium is one of the venues of the FIS Nordic World Ski Championships, and also one of the few 90 metre class jumping hills throughout the world. The maximum inclination of the Approach Slope, the area from the starting point to the take-off ramp with 101 metres, is 35 degrees, and the Landing Slope, the area drew lines of P-spot and K-spot, is 37 degrees. The P-spot was displayed by the blue line on the slope, which indicates the standard points for landing of ski jumping, while the K-spot is partitioned by the red line, and is designated as the area which gives ski jumpers additional points in the case of successful landing.

Visitors must use the moving staircase from the parking lot to the place where the stadium is located. The Ōkurayama Crystal House, a building which houses a souvenir shop and a restaurant, is located near the entrance, and the Winter Sports Museum is located in the other side. The construction of the museum was completed in December 1999, and opened to the public on April 22, 2000. It has 3 stories, and exhibits a number of materials related to the history of skiing, instruments, and media contents. To reach at the Mt. Okura Observation Platform located on the top of the ski jump, it is required to buy tickets to ride the lift toward the Observation Platform at the shop in front of the Ōkurayama Crystal House. Another route, a trail leading to the platform on the side of the ski jump, is also available. The places for observation are located both in the second and third floor, and visitors enjoy the view of the entire ski jump and Sapporo city from a height of 300 metres.

Hill record 
Unofficial or absolute records are all jumps that were at that time longer than official records but set in a lower circuit competitions such as continental cup, nationals etc., not actually counting.

Official

Unofficial

Access 
 JR Bus: 12 minutes from Maruyama Bus Terminal (Maruyama-Kōen Station, Tōzai Line) to Okurayama Kyogijo Iriguchi Bus stop, plus 10 minutes walking distance.

Sources

External links 

 Mt. Okura - Okurayama Observatory
 Okurayama Ski Jump

Chūō-ku, Sapporo
Venues of the 1972 Winter Olympics
Sports venues in Sapporo
Ski jumping venues in Japan
Olympic ski jumping venues
2017 Asian Winter Games Venues